Per Jonsson (born 10 February 1988) is a Paralympic athlete from Sweden who competes in F13 classification track and field events. Jonsson has represented Sweden at both the 2008 Summer Paralympics in Beijing and the 2012 Summer Paralympics in London, competing in the 100m sprint and the long jump. Jonsson has won both the World and European Championship titles in his sport, winning the long jump T13 World title in Doha in 2015.

References 

Living people
1988 births
Paralympic athletes of Sweden
People from Trollhättan
Sportspeople from Västra Götaland County
Athletes (track and field) at the 2008 Summer Paralympics
Athletes (track and field) at the 2012 Summer Paralympics
Athletes (track and field) at the 2020 Summer Paralympics
Swedish male long jumpers
Swedish male sprinters
Visually impaired long jumpers
Visually impaired sprinters
Paralympic long jumpers
Paralympic sprinters
21st-century Swedish people